Tribolonotus parkeri is a species of lizard in the family Scincidae. The species is endemic to Buka Island.

References

Tribolonotus
Reptiles of Papua New Guinea
Reptiles described in 2017
Natural history of Bougainville Island